France participated in the ninth Winter Paralympics in Turin, Italy. 

France entered 19 athletes in the following sports:

Alpine skiing: 8 male, 2 female
Nordic skiing: 6 male, 3 female

Medalists

See also
2006 Winter Paralympics
France at the 2006 Winter Olympics

External links
Torino 2006 Paralympic Games
International Paralympic Committee
Federation Francaise Handisport

2006
Nations at the 2006 Winter Paralympics
Winter Paralympics